Croatia (CRO) competed at the 2005 Mediterranean Games in Almería, Spain with a total number of 200 participants (117 men and 83 women).

Medals by sport

Medalists

See also
 Croatia at the 2004 Summer Olympics
 Croatia at the 2008 Summer Olympics

References
 Official Site

Nations at the 2005 Mediterranean Games
2005
Mediterranean Games